Chroustovice is a market town in Chrudim District in the Pardubice Region of the Czech Republic. It has about 1,200 inhabitants.

Administrative parts
Villages of Březovice, Holešovice, Lhota u Chroustovic, Mentour, Městec and Poděčely are administrative parts of Chroustovice.

History
The first written mention of Chroustovice is from 1349. In 1418, it became a market town.

Notable people
Rudolph Novak (1887–1968), American gymnast
Zdeněk Černohorský (1910–2001), lichenologist
František Pitra (1932–2018), politician, Prime Minister of Czech Socialist Republic (1988–90)

References

External links

 

Market towns in the Czech Republic
Populated places in Chrudim District